A gig, also called chair or chaise, is a light, two-wheeled sprung cart pulled by one horse.

Description
Gig carts are constructed with the driver's seat sitting higher than the level of the shafts.  Traditionally, a gig is more formal than a village cart or a meadowbrook cart, and more comfortable, usually being sprung. A light gig can be used for carriage racing. OED gives the date of first known reference to a horse-drawn gig as 1791, and they were ubiquitous by the early 1800s. 
There are several types of gig, including:
 calesín: small, one-horse, hooded, a seat behind for the driver, used in the Philippines; diminutive of Spanish calesa
 stanhope: typically having a high seat and closed back; named after Fitzroy Stanhope, a British clergyman who died in 1864.
 stick gig: lightweight, two-wheeled, for one person
 Tilbury (carriage), lightweight, two-wheeled,
 whiskey or whisky: small body that resembles a chair, suspended on leather braces attached to springs
Gigs travelling at night would normally carry two oil lamps with thick glass, known as gig-lamps. This caused the formerly common slang word "giglamps" for "spectacles".

The meaning of the term 'gig' is transferred from the deprecatory term for a 'flighty girl' and subsequently indicates anything which whirls, or is dangerous or unpredictable. Contemporary literature frequently recounted romantic tales of spills and hairbreadth scrapes from these vehicles, but is equally fulsome on the fearful thrill experienced in driving them.

References

External links

Gigs, Cabriolets and Curricles.  Jane Austen Centre Bath UK England.

Animal-powered vehicles
Carriages
Carts